Cheap Seats is the fifteenth studio album by the American country music band Alabama, released in 1993 by RCA Records. It produced the singles "Reckless", "T.L.C. A.S.A.P." and the title track. Of these, "Reckless" was the band's final Number One hit on the Billboard country charts until 2011's "Old Alabama", and "The Cheap Seats" was the band's first single in fourteen years to miss Top Ten of the charts. Alabama produced the album along with Josh Leo and Larry Michael Lee, except for "Angels Among Us", which bassist Teddy Gentry produced.

The album reached 16 on the Billboard Country Album Charts. It also reached number 76 on the Billboard 200.

Content
The album produced three singles on the Billboard Hot Country Singles & Tracks (now Hot Country Songs) charts. First was "Reckless", which became the band's thirty-second number one on that chart. After it came the number seven "T.L.C. A.S.A.P.", written by Gary Baker and Frank J. Myers, who then comprised the duo Baker & Myers. The album's title track was the final single release; it was co-written by Randy Sharp and Marcus Hummon, who also played harmonica on it. With a number thirteen peak, it became the band's first single to miss the country top ten since "My Home's in Alabama" in 1980. Of the three singles from this album, only "The Cheap Seats" was made into a music video.

"Angels Among Us" was also recorded by Becky Hobbs, its co-writer, on her 1994 album The Boots I Came to Town In. Alabama's rendition entered the country charts twice from unsolicited airplay: first at number 54 in 1994, and later at number 28 in January 1995 (after "We Can't Love Like This Anymore", the first single from the band's Greatest Hits Volume 3). "Angels Among Us" also reached number 22 on the Bubbling Under Hot 100 in January 1996. "Katy Brought My Guitar Back Today" was later recorded by Rhett Akins on his 1995 first album A Thousand Memories. Al Anderson, then a member of the band NRBQ, co-wrote "A Better Word for Love", which NRBQ recorded on its 1994 album Message for the Mess Age.

Critical reception
Dan Cooper gave the album three stars out of five in his Allmusic review. He called the title track "way cute" and cited "A Better Word for Love" as a "quiet, morning love song". Tom Roland gave an identical star rating in New Country magazine, citing it as an "excellent example of a band that still has a chemistry holding it together" and "[n]othing monumental here, just a good, solid Alabama album". He also cited the title track as a standout for "avoiding the now-stale Dixie tributes".

Track listing

"Clear Water Blues" and "A Better Word for Love" are omitted from the cassette version.

Personnel 
As listed in liner notes.

Alabama
 Jeff Cook – lead guitar, fiddle, vocals
 Randy Owen – rhythm guitar, vocals
 Teddy Gentry – bass guitar (1-7, 9, 10, 11), vocals
 Mark Herndon – drums, percussion, vocals
 Lead vocals by Randy Owen on all tracks, except Teddy Gentry on "Clear Water Blues" and Jeff Cook on "This Love's on Me".

Additional musicians
 Bill Cuomo – acoustic piano, keyboards, Hammond B3 organ
 Carl Marsh – synth strings
 Mark Casstevens – acoustic guitar
 Bill Hullett – acoustic guitar
 Bernie Leadon – acoustic guitar, banjo
 Biff Watson – acoustic guitar
 Josh Leo – acoustic guitar, electric guitar
 John Willis – acoustic guitar, electric guitar, electric sitar (8), talk box guitar (9)
 Dann Huff – electric guitar
 George Marinelli – electric guitar
 Brent Rowan – electric guitar
 Sam Bush – fiddle, mandolin
 Larry Paxton – bass guitar (8)
 Craig Krampf – drums, percussion
 Jim Horn – saxophone (1)
 Jim Nelson – saxophone (8)
 Charles Rose – trombone
 Marcus Hummon – harmonica (5)
 Kirk "Jelly Roll" Johnson – harmonica (9)
 Sanctuary Choir and Young Musicians Choir of First Baptist Church, Fort Payne, Alabama – choir (11)

Production
 Alabama – producers (1-10)
 Larry Michael Lee – producer (1-10)
 Josh Leo – producer (1-10)
 Teddy Gentry – producer (11)
 Steve Marcantonio – mixing 
 Jay Messina – recording (1-9)
 Jeff Giedt – recording (1-9), mix assistant 
 Timothy Dobson – recording (10)
 Ed Turner – recording (11)
 Russ Martin – recording assistant (1-9)
 Darren Smith – recording assistant (1-9)
 Nick Sparks – recording assistant (1-9)
 James Geddes – additional overdub recording 
 Don Cobb – editing 
 Denny Purcell – mastering 
 Georgetown Masters (Nashville, Tennessee) – editing and mastering location 
 Joe Johnston – production coordinator 
 Mary Hamilton – art direction 
 Beth Middleworth – design 
 Gary Kelly – illustration 
 Dean Dixon – photography 
 Jim "Señor" McGuire – photography
 Dale Morris & Associates – management

Charts

Weekly charts

Year-end charts

Certifications

References

1993 albums
Albums produced by Josh Leo
RCA Records albums
Alabama (American band) albums